McCook is a village in Cook County, Illinois, United States, and is an industrial suburb of Chicago. As of the 2020 census, the village population was 249, which is the lowest population of all municipalities in the county.

History 
McCook was named for John J. McCook, a late 19th-century director of the Santa Fe Railroad and a former Civil War officer. McCook station was served by the railroad in the town.  The Outlaws Motorcycle Club was established in McCook in 1935 when Old Route 66 passed through the town. In 1958, six people were killed in an explosion at a Reynolds Metals plant. In 1995, the former Universal Oil Products Riverside Laboratory in McCook was awarded with National Historic Chemical Landmark status.

Geography
McCook is located at  (41.798542, -87.832432).

McCook is home to a small population but a large amount of heavy industry, resulting in a large tax base.

Demographics
As of the 2020 census there were 249 people, 107 households, and 87 families residing in the village. The racial makeup of the village was 64.26% White, 1.20% Asian, 10.44% from other races, and 24.10% from two or more races. Hispanic or Latino of any race were 36.55% of the population.

There were 107 households, out of which 64.49% had children under the age of 18 living with them, 50.47% were married couples living together, 22.43% had a female householder with no husband present, and 18.69% were non-families. 16.82% of all households were made up of individuals, and 11.21% had someone living alone who was 65 years of age or older. The average household size was 3.18 and the average family size was 2.96.

The village's age distribution consisted of 24.9% under the age of 18, 13.6% from 18 to 24, 21.7% from 25 to 44, 17% from 45 to 64, and 22.7% who were 65 years of age or older. The median age was 31.4 years. For every 100 females, there were 108.6 males. For every 100 females age 18 and over, there were 101.7 males.

The median income for a household in the village was $75,417, and the median income for a family was $65,417. Males had a median income of $50,714 versus $33,750 for females. The per capita income for the village was $28,757. About 3.4% of families and 5.0% of the population were below the poverty line, including 3.8% of those under age 18 and 5.6% of those age 65 or over.

Government
McCook is in Illinois's 3rd congressional district.

Business
McCook is home to a large amount of heavy industry, including portions of Vulcan Materials Company McCook Quarry, UOP, and the Electro-Motive Diesel (EMD) railroad locomotive plant.  Known as the LaGrange plant for its mailing address (McCook does not have its own post office), EMD produced most of their locomotives there from 1935 to 1991, when parent company General Motors moved all final-assembly operations to London, Ontario.  The LaGrange plant continues to manufacture locomotive parts and engines, and also serves as the EMD U.S. headquarters.

Education
A part of McCook is served by the Lyons School District 103 and J. Sterling Morton High School District 201's Morton West High School located in Berwyn.

Another part of McCook is served by Lyons Township High School in Western Springs/LaGrange.

References

 
Villages in Illinois
Villages in Cook County, Illinois
Chicago metropolitan area